The Berthold-Bezelins were a German noble family from the 10th century, whose sphere of influence and property laid about the Trechirgau and Maifeldgau. They were the Counts of Stromberg before that county became a part of the Electorate of the Palatinate. The family is named after the prevailing first name Berthold, and its variation Bezelin. The Berthold-Bezelins supposedly descended from the Ernestiner (Counts of Sualafeld) and through them from the Luitpoldinger Dukes of Bavaria as a junior lineage.

Genealogy 
The reconstructed genealogy by D. C. Jackman reads
 a. Ernst II/IV (Ernestiner), m. N.N., sister of Erenfried II of the House of the Ezzonen
 b1. Berthold I, Count in Maifeldgau and Trechirgau (fl. 966), m. Alberada, granddaughter of Eberhard (II) of Maienfeld (d. ca. 944) of the House of the Matfridinger
 c1. Bezelin or Berthold II, Count in Maifeldgau and Trechirgau  (d. 1010)
 d1. Berthold III, Count in Maifeldgau and Trechirgau (d. 1043?), Count in Wetterau, successor of Otto of Hammerstein, m. N.N. of the House of the Ezzonen
 e1. Berthold IV, Count in Maifeldgau and Trechirgau  (d. 1075/81), 1064 Count ca. Wetterau/Maingau
 e2. Udo,  1040 Count
 e3. Ezzo, 1048 Count in Niddagau
 e4. Kunigunde, m. Emich IV, Count in Nahegau (Emichones)
 f1. Berthold I of Nürings, heir to jurisdiction of Niddagau and Wetterau
 e5. N.N., m. Stephan I, Count of Sponheim, heirs to some jurisdiction of Trechirgau and Maifeldgau (Sponheimer)
 c2. Gerlach, Count of Lower Lahngau, 1013 Count in Maingau (founder of the House of Diez)

Jackman cites Berthold of Ham (d. 1101), advocate of Prüm and documented with the Vianden cognomen, as a probable scion of this family and founder of the House of Vianden, a Sponheim branch.

Literature 
 Jackman, Donald C. Stromburg. Medieval German Counties. Medieval Prosopography. http://www.enlaplage.com/prosop/counts/countyA/county85.htm

German noble families
Noble families of the Holy Roman Empire